Body of Evidence may refer to:

 Body of Evidence (1988 film), a 1988 TV film starring Barry Bostwick and Margot Kidder
 Body of Evidence (novel), a 1991 novel by Patricia Cornwell
 Body of Evidence (1993 film), a 1993 erotic drama starring Madonna and Willem Dafoe
 Body of Evidence, a 1999 mystery novel series by Christopher Golden
 Body of Evidence: From the case files of Dayle Hinman, a 2001 television series showcasing the case files of Dayle Hinman on truTV

See also
Body of Proof, a 2011 TV series
Bodies of Evidence (disambiguation)